Brylivka is an urban-type settlement in Kherson Raion, Kherson Oblast, southern Ukraine. Brylivka belongs to Vynohradove rural hromada, one of the hromadas of Ukraine. It has a population of

Administrative status 
Until 18 July, 2020, Brylivka belonged to Oleshky Raion. The raion was abolished in July 2020 as part of the administrative reform of Ukraine, which reduced the number of raions of Kherson Oblast to five. The area of Oleshky Raion was merged into Kherson Raion.

Economy

Transportation
Brylivka railway station is on the railway which used to connect Kherson with Dzhankoi; however, after the Russian annexation of Crimea in 2014, the trains only run as far as Vadim, close to the border with Crimea. There is infrequent passenger traffic.

On 30 July 2022, the Ukrainian army claimed that it stroke Russian train in Brylivka.

The settlement has access to Highway M17 which runs northwest to Kherson and southeast to the border with Crimea.

See also 

 Russian occupation of Kherson Oblast

References

Urban-type settlements in Kherson Raion